Malras is a commune in the Aude department in southern France.

The British military illustrator and author Michael Chappell lived in the village.

Population

See also
Communes of the Aude department

References

Communes of Aude
Aude communes articles needing translation from French Wikipedia